South Carolina Highway 10 (SC 10) is a  state highway in the U.S. state of South Carolina that travels from SC 28 near McCormick to the U.S. Route 25 Business (US 25 Bus.), US 178 Bus., and SC 34 in Greenwood. The highway is a two-lane highway that serves as a connector between McCormick and Greenwood. The first  is known as McCormick Highway, while the remaining  is known as Maxwell Avenue.

Route description
SC 10 is a  two-lane, minor state highway in the southwest portion of the Upstate of South Carolina. The route runs generally south to north. Most of the route (particularly the southern portion) runs through or alongside the Sumter National Forest. The route begins just northwest of McCormick heading north to where is it begins a brief concurrency with US 221. The route continues on northward to Greenwood, where it enters the city's southwest side, ending at the US 25 Bus./US 178 Bus./SC 34 concurrency.

History

SC 10 is one of the original state highways, being created in 1922. The original route began in McCormick and ran north to Greenwood, Laurens, Woodruff, Spartanburg, and Chesnee before exiting the state into North Carolina where US 221 Alt. does today. From the 1920s to the 1950s, the route was slowly shortened to the  route. The route now serves as a minor state highway.

Junction list

See also

References

External links

 
 SC 10 at Virginia Highways' South Carolina Highways Annex

010
Transportation in McCormick County, South Carolina
Transportation in Greenwood County, South Carolina